Federico Gentili Di Giuseppe, also known as Frédéric Gentili di Giuseppe (Vittorio Veneto, March 24, 1868 - Paris, April 20, 1940) was a Jewish businessman and art collector whose collection was looted during the Nazi era.

Early life 
Federico Gentili di Giuseppe was born in 1868 into a wealthy Italian Jewish family, the son of Giuseppe and Carolina Gentili di Giuseppe. He married Emma de Castro, with whom he had two children: Marcello (born 1901) and Adriana (born 1903).

Translations and art collection 
During the 1920s he moved to Paris. He translated Stendhal's writings into Italian and devoted much energy to collecting works of art and came to own 150 Italian paintings (including the famous Christ carrying the cross by Girolamo Romani).

In 1922 he bought a telescope built by Emile Schaër around 1910; this was given in 1946 to the Pic del Migdia Observatory by his son Marcel in gratitude for the protection offered him during the Second World War from 1942.

Nazi seizures 
In April 1940: Federico Gentili di Giuseppe died, leaving his two children, Marcello and Adriana Gentili di Giuseppe, who fled from Nazi occupied territory in June 1940. A French court ordered the seizure and sale of Gentili di Giuseppe's property, and the auction took place at the Hôtel Drouot in Paris in April 1941.

Claims for restitution 
In 1950 his daughter Adriana began trying to claim the return of the looted paintings from the Louvre after seeing them on display there, but the museum refused her requests repeatedly, in 1951, in 1955 and in 1961.

In 1998, the heirs of Federico Gentili di Giuseppe sued the Louvre Museum in Paris for five artworks in a lawsuit known as Gentili di Giuseppe Heirs v. Musée du Louvre and France. The appeals court ordered the restitution of the artworks to the heirs on June 2, 1999. The paintings, which had been acquired by intermediaries for the Nazi Hermann Göring were: “La Visitation” by Moretto da Brescia (1498-1554); “La Sainte Famille” by Bernardo Strozzi (1581-1644); “Alexandre et Campaspe chez Apelle” by Giambattista Tiepolo (1669-1770); “Joueurs de cartes devant une cheminée” by Alessandro Magnasco (1667-1749); and “Portrait de femme” by Rosalba Carriera (1675-1757).

In 1999, Gentili de Giuseppe's heirs request the return of  a bust by Francesco Mochi ("Bust of a Young Boy") from the Art Institute of Chicago. The bust had been sold in France in a sale that was later annulled by French judges because it was Nazi spoliation. The parties settled in 2000.  

In 2000, Gentili di Giuseppe's heirs contacted the Museum of Fine Arts (MFA) Boston concerning the restitution of the painting “Adoration of the Magi”, by Corrado Giaquinto. The MFA had purchased the painting from Thomas Agnew & Sons, Ltd, which had acquired it at Christie's. A settlement involving a "part purchase-part donation agreement" was reached in October 2000.

In 2012 a judge in the case "Christ Carrying the Cross Dragged by a Rascal – Gentili di Giuseppe Heirs v. Italy" ordered the Pinacoteca di Brera in Milan return the 16th century Baroque painting to the heirs of Federico Gentili di Giuseppe.   Christ Carrying the Cross Dragged By A Rascal by Girolamo de Romani was one of 70 items stolen from the collection of Frederico Gentili di Giuseppe under the French Vichy Government. 

In 2022, in an interview about Nazi looted art, Corinne Hershkovitch talked about the challenges of researching the fate of the Gentili Di Giuseppe collection.

See also 
List of claims for restitution for Nazi-looted art
The Holocaust in France
Nazi plunder

References 

Jewish art collectors

Jews who emigrated to escape Nazism

Nazi-looted art

Subjects of Nazi art appropriations
Italian art collectors
1868 births
1940 deaths
19th-century Italian Jews
20th-century Italian Jews